Alain Casanova (born 18 September 1961) is a French former footballer who played as a goalkeeper. He most recently was manager of Swiss side FC Lausanne-Sport.

Career
Born in Clermont-Ferrand, Casanova played for Cournon, INF Vichy, Le Havre AC, Olympique de Marseille and Toulouse FC. At Marseille, he made no professional appearances, but was on the bench at the 1991 European Cup Final, which the team lost to Red Star Belgrade in Bari. 

On 30 May 2008, he was named manager of former club Toulouse, after the sacking of Élie Baup. In his first season in charge, the team came fourth, and qualified for the renamed UEFA Europa League, while striker André-Pierre Gignac was the league's top scorer with 24 goals. The side also reached the semi-finals of the Coupe de France, where they lost 2–1 to Guingamp; in the 2009–10 Coupe de la Ligue, Toulouse reached the same round and were eliminated by the same score after extra time by Marseille. He was dismissed in March 2015, with the club three points from safety in 18th with nine games to play; he was Ligue 1's longest-serving incumbent manager at the time.

On 13 June 2016, Casanova was named as the new manager of Ligue 2 club RC Lens, succeeding Antoine Kombouaré on a two-year deal with the option of a third. He was sacked on 20 August 2017 after losing all four of the team's first matches of the new season.

On 22 June 2018, Casanova was named once again as the manager of Toulouse in Ligue 1, replacing Michaël Debève. He was sacked on 10 October 2019, with the side down in 18th place.

On 3 February 2022, he was confirmed as the new head coach of struggling Swiss Super League club FC Lausanne-Sport. Despite improving on their performance, he was unable to fend off the looming disaster and three rounds before the end of the season, the club's relegation was already confirmed with a twelve point deficit. On 22 May 2022, his contract at Lausanne was terminated.

Managerial statistics

Honours
Le Havre
French Division 2: 1984–85

References

External links
Alain Casanova at Om.net

Living people
1961 births
French footballers
Le Havre AC players
Olympique de Marseille players
Toulouse FC players
Ligue 1 players
Ligue 2 players
French football managers
Toulouse FC managers
RC Lens managers
Ligue 1 managers
Ligue 2 managers
Sportspeople from Clermont-Ferrand
Association football goalkeepers
INF Vichy players
Footballers from Auvergne-Rhône-Alpes